Oakengates is a constituent town and civil parish in Telford and Wrekin, Shropshire, England. The towns parish population was recorded as 8,517 in the 2001 census.

Etymology
The name is not derived from "oak" or "gates" but is derived from the Ancient Brythonic name for the valley which was Usc-con, meaning The Lake(Usc(water) and the confluence(Cond) of two streams (see Cartlidge), and from the Old Norse gata, path; see gh- in Indo-European roots. meaning boundary or Road. So Usc-con gait is at the Road at the vale of Usc-con. The Vales and Gates of Usc-Con: A history of Oakengates was written by local historian Reverend J.E.G. Cartlidge whose name is commemorated in the name of the retirement home Cartlidge House.

History

Transport
In the late 18th century the Ketley Canal was constructed to carry coal and ironstone from Oakengates to Ketley works. The canal has long since fallen into disuse and little trace of it can be found today. The first boat lift in Britain was an experimental one built at Oakengates in 1794 by Robert Weldon of Lichfield. A full-scale version was to be built on the Somerset Coal Canal at Rowley Bottom near Combe Hay, but the lift jammed and failed while being demonstrated and the construction was abandoned.

The Shrewsbury to Wolverhampton railway line runs through the town and there is a station and a tunnel (Oakengates Tunnel).

Oakengates was also served by the Coalport Branch Line and had a second station called Oakengates Market Street railway station which closed in 1952. It is now Station Hill with only the goods shed still standing.

Industry
Shadrach Fox ran the Wombridge Iron Works in Oakengates and with Abraham Darby was involved in experiments on methods of producing pig iron in a blast furnace fuelled by coke rather than charcoal. In the field of ferrous metallurgy this was a major step forward in the production of iron as a raw material for the Industrial Revolution.  In 1701 he placed his brother in charge of the blast furnace, at Wombridge to which Isaac Hawkins supplied a large quantity of coal and ironstone, which suggests that they already smelted iron with coke there - a major technological breakthrough which is now solely commemorated at nearby Coalbrookdale.

The town had a considerable manufacturing sector well into the 20th century and one of the products of this can still be seen at the Museum of Power in Langford, Essex. This has, still in working order, what is believed to be the last steam engine built and installed by the Lilleshall Company Ltd. It was commissioned on 13 January 1931.

Church
The present Church of England parish church of Holy Trinity was built in 1854, when a separate ecclesiastical parish had been created from parts of the older parishes of Wombridge and Shifnal.

Amenities
Oakengates has Telford's main theatre, which was originally opened in 1968 as Oakengates' Town Hall by champion jockey Sir Gordon Richards, after whose Derby-winning horse is named one of its rooms, the Pinza Suite. Nearby are the town council's headquarters and the United Reformed/Methodist church.

Oakengates' main public open space is Hartshill Park, originally created as the Oakengates Sports and Recreation Ground. by levelling a coal mine spoil heap. Opened in 1927, it remains a valuable facility including bowling green and tennis courts. In 1928 the present park gates were unveiled as a war memorial to local men who died serving in World War I whose names are listed on the gate piers, the World War II casualties being listed on outlying pillars.

Real Ale
The town has a growing reputation as offering an "all year real ale festival".  It has three pubs in the CAMRA guide, more than many towns very much greater in size. These are the Crown Inn, The Old Fighting Cocks and The Station Inn, which are all within a few feet of each other and collectively offer a wide range of real ales, principally  from smaller breweries. Over 20 can typically be found at any one time and special beer festivals at the individual pubs can expand this range even further at certain times of year.

Urban District Council 
Before the formation of the District of The Wrekin (Telford) and later the Borough of Telford and The Wrekin, the Urban District of Oakengates comprised Oakengates, Wrockwardine Wood, St. George's, Priorslee, Snedshill, The Nabb, Wombridge and Trench, and always had a Labour council.

Sport
Oakengates Athletic F.C., which in 2018 merged into Wellington Amateurs, played in the Shropshire County Premier Football League.

Notable people
George Swift (1870-1956), professional footballer (notably Wolves when they won 1893 FA Cup Final), later manager of Chesterfield and Southampton, born at Oakengates.
Will Osborne (1875-1942), Welsh rugby union international player, settled at The Nabb.
Jack Elkes (1894-1972), professional footballer, born at Snedshill.
Harry Chambers (1896-1949), England international footballer, settled in Oakengates where he kept a local public house; buried at Wombridge.
Tommy Jones (1907-1980), professional footballer, born and settled there after retiring from play, keeping a local shop.
Johnny Hancocks (1919-1994), professional footballer, born and settled there after retiring from play.
Eric Hope (1927-2009), professional footballer, born Oakengates.
Lucy Allan (1964-   ), Conservative politician, current MP for Telford, has house in Oakengates which is within her constituency.
David Wright (1966-  ), Labour politician who served as MP for Telford 2001–2015, was born in Oakengates.

See also
Listed buildings in Oakengates

References

Towns in Shropshire
Telford